Demir Turgut (born 30 May 1909, date of death unknown) was a Turkish sailor. He competed in the O-Jolle event at the 1936 Summer Olympics.

References

External links
 

1909 births
Year of death missing
Turkish male sailors (sport)
Olympic sailors of Turkey
Sailors at the 1936 Summer Olympics – O-Jolle
Sportspeople from Stockholm